Nokhelal Daheriya was an Indian politician from the state of the Madhya Pradesh.
He represented Chhindwara Vidhan Sabha constituency of undivided Madhya Pradesh Legislative Assembly by winning General election of 1957. His full name is '''Nokhelal Daheriya.

References 

Year of birth missing
Possibly living people
People from Madhya Pradesh
Madhya Pradesh MLAs 1957–1962
People from Chhindwara
Indian National Congress politicians from Madhya Pradesh